Borja Navarro may refer to:

 Borja Navarro Landáburu, a Spanish defender who plays for AFC Săgeata Năvodari
 Borja Navarro García, a Spanish forward who plays for Albacete Balompié